Tolyposporium is a genus of fungi belonging to the family Anthracoideaceae.

The genus was described in 1887 by Woronin ex J.Schröt.

The genus has cosmopolitan distribution.

Species:
 Tolyposporium ehrenbergii (J.G. Kühn) Pat., 1903

References

Ustilaginomycotina
Basidiomycota genera
Taxa named by Joseph Schröter